Statistics of Allsvenskan in season 1956/1957.

Overview
The league was contested by 12 teams, with IFK Norrköping winning the championship.

League table

Results

Footnotes

References 

Allsvenskan seasons
1956–57 in Swedish association football leagues
Sweden